Racism in Australia comprises negative attitudes and views on race or ethnicity which are related to each other, are held by various people and groups in Australia, and have been reflected in discriminatory laws, practices and actions (including violence) at various times in the history of Australia against racial or ethnic groups.

Racism against various ethnic or minority groups has existed in Australia since British colonisation. Throughout Australian history, the Indigenous peoples of Australia have faced severe restrictions on their political, social, and economic freedoms, and suffered genocide, forced removals, and massacres, and continue to face discrimination. African, Asian, Pacific Islander, and Middle Eastern Australians have also been the victims of discrimination. In addition, Jews, Italians, and the Irish were often subjected to xenophobic exclusion and other forms of ethnicity-based discrimination.

Racism has manifested itself in a variety of ways, including segregation, racist immigration and naturalisation laws, and internment camps.

Background

White Australia policy 

Following the establishment of autonomous parliaments, a rise in nationalism and improvements in transportation, the Australian colonies voted to unite in a Federation, which came into being in 1901. The Australian Constitution and early parliaments established one of the most progressive governmental systems on the earth at that time, with male and female suffrage and series of checks and balances built into the governmental framework. National security fears had been one of the chief motivators for the union and legislation was quickly enacted to restrict non-European immigration to Australia – the foundation of the White Australia policy – and voting rights for Aboriginal people were denied across most states.

Australia's official World War One historian Charles Bean defined the early intentions of the policy as "a vehement effort to maintain a high Western standard of economy, society and culture (necessitating at that stage, however it might be camouflaged, the rigid exclusion of Oriental people)."

The new Parliament quickly moved to restrict immigration to maintain Australia's "British character", and the Pacific Island Labourers Bill and the Immigration Restriction Bill were passed shortly before parliament rose for its first Christmas recess. Nevertheless, the Colonial Secretary in Britain made it clear that a race based immigration policy would run "contrary to the general conceptions of equality which have ever been the guiding principle of British rule throughout the Empire", so the Barton Government conceived of the "language dictation test", which would allow the government, at the discretion of the minister, to block unwanted migrants by forcing them to sit a test in "any European language". Race had already been established as a premise for exclusion among the colonial parliaments, so the main question for debate was who exactly the new Commonwealth ought to exclude, with the Labor Party rejecting Britain's calls to placate the populations of its non-white colonies and allow "aboriginal natives of Asia, Africa, or the islands thereof". There was opposition from Queensland and its sugar industry to the proposals of the Pacific Islanders Bill to exclude "Kanaka" labourers, however Barton argued that the practice was "veiled slavery" that could lead to a "negro problem" similar to that in the United States and the Bill was passed.

Demise of the White Australia policy 
The restrictive measures established by the first parliament gave way to multi-ethnic immigration policies only after the Second World War, with the "dictation test" itself being finally abolished in 1958 by the Menzies Government.

The Menzies Government instigated migrants over all others since the time of Australian Federation in 1901 and abolished restrictions on voting rights for Aboriginal people, which had persisted in some jurisdictions. In 1950 External Affairs Minister Percy Spender instigated the Colombo Plan, under which students from Asian countries were admitted to study at Australian universities, then in 1957 non-Europeans with 15 years' residence in Australia were allowed to become citizens. In a watershed legal reform, a 1958 revision of the Migration Act introduced a simpler system for entry and abolished the "dictation test" which had permitted the exclusion of migrants on the basis of their ability to take down a dictation offered in any European language. Immigration Minister, Sir Alexander Downer, announced that 'distinguished and highly qualified Asians' might immigrate. Restrictions continued to be relaxed through the 1960s in the lead up to the Holt Government's watershed Migration Act, 1966.

Holt's government introduced the Migration Act 1966, which effectively dismantled the White Australia policy and increased access to non-European migrants, including refugees fleeing the Vietnam War. Holt also called the 1967 Referendum which removed the discriminatory clause in the Australian Constitution which excluded Aboriginal Australians from being counted in the census;– the referendum was one of the few to be overwhelmingly endorsed by the Australian electorate (over 90% voted 'yes').

The legal end of the White Australia Policy is usually placed in 1973, when the Whitlam Labor government implemented a series of amendments preventing the enforcement of racial aspects of the immigration law. These amendments:
 Legislated that all migrants, regardless of origin, be eligible to obtain citizenship after three years of permanent residence.
 Ratified all international agreements relating to immigration and race.
 Issued policy to totally disregard race as a factor in selecting migrants.

The 1975 Racial Discrimination Act made the use of racial criteria for any official purpose illegal (with the exception of census forms).

2000s 
A 2003 Paper by health economist Gavin Mooney said that "Government institutions in Australia are racist". The paper evidenced this opinion by stating that the Aboriginal Medical Service was underfunded and under supported by government.

In 2007, What's the Score? A survey of cultural diversity and racism in Australian sport conducted by the Human Rights and Equal Opportunity Commission (HREOC) said that "racial abuse and vilification is commonplace in Australian sport... despite concerted efforts to stamp it out". The report said that Aboriginal and other ethnic groups are under-represented in Australian sport, and suggests they are turned off organised sport because they fear racial vilification. Despite the finding, indigenous participation in Australian sport is widespread. In 2009, about 90,000 Aboriginal and Torres Strait Islanders were participating in Australian Rules Football alone and the Australian Football League (AFL) encouraged their participation through the Kickstart Indigenous programs "as the vehicle to improve the quality of life in Indigenous communities, not only in sport, but in the areas of employment, education and health outcomes". Similarly, Australia's second most popular football code encourages participation through events like the NSW Aboriginal Rugby League Knockout and the Indigenous All Stars Team.

2005 UN report 
The UN Committee on the Elimination of Racial Discrimination in its report, released in 2005 was complimentary on improvements in race-related issues since its previous report five years prior, namely: 
 the criminalising of acts and incitement of racial hatred in most Australian states and territories 
 progress in the economic, social and cultural rights by Indigenous peoples
 programmes and practices among the police and the judiciary, aimed at reducing the number of Indigenous juveniles entering the criminal justice system
 the adoption of a Charter of Public Service in a Culturally Diverse Society to ensure that government services are provided in a way that is sensitive to the language and cultural needs of all Australians
and the numerous human rights education programmes developed by the Human Rights and Equal Opportunity Commission (HREOC)
 
The committee expressed concern about the abolishment of ATSIC; proposed reforms to HREOC that may limit its independence; the practical barriers Indigenous peoples face in succeeding in claims for native title; a lack of legislation criminalising serious acts or incitement of racial hatred in the Commonwealth, the State of Tasmania and the Northern Territory; and the inequities between Indigenous peoples and others in the areas of employment, housing, longevity, education and income.

Overview

Studies

Housing 

Throughout the entire rental system, from property procurement and investment prior to the search for a rental property, through to eviction, discrimination in the private rental sector (PRS) occurs.

Aversive racism 
Rather than colour-blind, Australia is race averse.

Indigenous Australians
Indigenous peoples of Australia, comprising Aboriginal and Torres Strait Islanders peoples, have lived in Australia for at least 65,000 years before the arrival of the First Fleet in 1788. The colonisation of Australia and development into a modern nation, saw explicit and implicit racial discrimination against Indigenous Australians.

Indigenous Australians continue to be subjected to racist government policy and community attitudes. Racist community attitudes towards Aboriginal people have been confirmed as continuing both by surveys of Indigenous Australians and self-disclosure of racist attitudes by non-Indigenous Australians.

Since 2007, government policy considered to be racist include the Northern Territory Intervention which failed to produce a single child abuse conviction, cashless welfare cards trialled almost exclusively in Aboriginal communities, the Community Development Program that has seen Indigenous participants fined at a substantially higher rate than non-Indigenous participants in equivalent work-for-the-dole schemes, and calls to shut down remote Indigenous communities despite the United Nation's Declaration on the Rights of Indigenous Peoples specifying governments must facilitate the rights of Indigenous people to live on traditional land.

In 2016, police raids and behaviour on Palm Island following a death in custody were found to have breached the Racial Discrimination Act 1975, with a record class action settlement of $30 million awarded to victims in May 2018. The raids were found by the court to be "racist" and "unnecessary, disproportionate" with police having "acted in these ways because they were dealing with an Aboriginal community."

Legal status
Despite Indigenous peoples being recognised under British common law as British subjects, with equal rights under the law, colonial government policy and public opinion treated Aboriginal peoples as inferior. The Nationality and Citizenship Act 1948, which came into force on 26 January 1949, created an Australian citizenship, but which co-existed with the continuing status of British subject. Aboriginal people became Australian citizens under the 1948 Act in the same way as other Australians, but they were not counted in the Australian population until after the 1967 referendum. The same applied to Torres Strait Islanders and the indigenous population of the Territory of Papua (then a part of Australia).

In 1770 and again in 1788, the British Empire claimed Eastern Australia as its own on the basis of the now discredited doctrine of terra nullius. The implication of the doctrine became evident when John Batman purported to make Batman's Treaty in 1835 with the Wurundjeri Elders of the area around the future Melbourne. Governor Bourke of New South Wales proclaimed the Treaty null and void and that indigenous Australians could not sell or assign land, nor could an individual person or group acquire it, other than through distribution by the Crown. Though the so-called Treaty was objectionable on many grounds, it was the first, and until the 1990s, the only time that an attempt was made to deal directly with the Indigenous peoples.

Historical relations
English navigator James Cook claimed the east coast of Australia for the British Empire in 1770, without conducting negotiations with the existing inhabitants. The first Governor of New South Wales, Arthur Phillip, was expressly instructed to establish friendship and good relations with Aboriginal people and interactions between the early settlers and the Indigenous people varied considerably throughout the colonial period – from the mutual curiosity displayed by the early interlocutors Bennelong and Bungaree of Sydney, to outright hostility of Pemulwuy and Windradyne of the Sydney region, and Yagan around Perth. Bennelong and a companion became the first Australians to sail to Europe, where they met King George III. Bungaree accompanied the explorer Matthew Flinders on the first circumnavigation of Australia. Pemulwuy was accused of the first killing of a white settler in 1790, and Windradyne resisted colonial settlement beyond the Blue Mountains.

With the establishment of European settlement and its subsequent expansion, the Indigenous populations were progressively forced into neighbouring territories, or subsumed into the new political entities of the Australian colonies. Violent conflict between Indigenous peoples and European settlers, described by some historians as frontier wars, arose out of this expansion: by the late 19th century, many Indigenous populations had been forcibly relocated to land reserves and missions. The nature of many of these land reserves and missions enabled disease to spread quickly and many were closed as resident numbers dropped, with the remaining residents being moved to other land reserves and missions in the 20th century.

According to the historian Geoffrey Blainey, in Australia during the colonial period: "In a thousand isolated places there were occasional shootings and spearings. Even worse, smallpox, measles, influenza and other new diseases swept from one Aboriginal camp to another ... The main conqueror of Aborigines was to be disease and its ally, demoralisation".

From the 1830s, colonial governments established the now controversial offices of the Protector of Aborigines in an effort to conduct government policy towards them. Christian churches sought to convert Aboriginal people, and were often used by government to carry out welfare and assimilation policies. Colonial churchmen such as Sydney's first Catholic archbishop, John Bede Polding, strongly advocated for Aboriginal rights and dignity and prominent Aboriginal activist Noel Pearson, who was raised at a Lutheran mission in Cape York, has written that Christian missions throughout Australia's colonial history "provided a haven from the hell of life on the Australian frontier while at the same time facilitating colonisation".

The Coniston massacre, which took place near the Coniston cattle station in the then Territory of Central Australia (now the Northern Territory) from 14 August to 18 October 1928, was the last known officially sanctioned massacre of Indigenous Australians and one of the last events of the Australian Frontier Wars.

The Caledon Bay crisis of 1932–34 saw one of the last incidents of violent interaction on the "frontier" of Indigenous and non-indigenous Australia, which began when the spearing of Japanese poachers who had been molesting Yolngu women was followed by the killing of a policeman. As the crisis unfolded, national opinion swung behind the Aboriginal people involved, and the first appeal on behalf of an Indigenous Australian to the High Court of Australia was launched. Following the crisis, the anthropologist Donald Thomson was dispatched by the government to live among the Yolngu. Elsewhere around this time, activists like Sir Douglas Nicholls were commencing their campaigns for Aboriginal rights within the established Australian political system and the age of frontier conflict closed.

Frontier encounters in Australia were not universally negative. Positive accounts of Aboriginal customs and encounters are also recorded in the journals of early European explorers, who often relied on Aboriginal guides and assistance: Charles Sturt employed Aboriginal envoys to explore the Murray-Darling; the lone survivor of the ill-fated Burke and Wills expedition, John King, was helped by local Aboriginal people, and the famous tracker Jackey Jackey accompanied his ill-fated friend Edmund Kennedy to Cape York. Respectful studies were conducted by such as Walter Baldwin Spencer and Frank Gillen in their renowned anthropological study The Native Tribes of Central Australia (1899); and by Donald Thomson of Arnhem Land (c. 1935 – 1943). In inland Australia, the skills of Aboriginal stockmen became highly regarded and in the 20th century, Aboriginal stockmen like Vincent Lingiari became national figures in their campaigns for better pay and conditions.

1938 was an important year for Indigenous rights campaigning. With the participation of leading indigenous activists like Douglas Nicholls, the Australian Aborigines Advancement League organised a protest "Day of Mourning" to mark the 150th anniversary of the arrival of the First Fleet of British in Australia and launched its campaign for full citizenship rights for all Aboriginal people. In the 1940s, the conditions of life for Aboriginal people could be very poor. A permit system restricted movement and work opportunities for many Aboriginal people. In the 1950s, the government pursued a policy of "assimilation" which sought to achieve full citizenship rights for Aboriginal people but also wanted them to adopt the mode of life of other Australians (which very often was assumed to require suppression of cultural identity).

World War II to the 2000s 

The White Australia policy was dismantled in the decades following the Second World War and legal reforms undertaken to address indigenous disadvantage and establish Land Rights and Native Title.

In 1962, Robert Menzies' Commonwealth Electoral Act provided that all Indigenous people should have the right to enrol and vote at federal elections (prior to this, indigenous people in Queensland, Western Australia and "wards of the state" in the Northern Territory had been excluded from voting unless they were ex-servicemen). In 1965, Queensland became the last state to confer state voting rights on Aboriginal people, whereas in South Australia Aboriginal men had had the vote since the 1850s and Aboriginal women since the 1890s.  A number of South Australian Aboriginal women took part in the vote selecting candidates for the constitutional conventions of the 1890s. The 1967 referendum was held and overwhelmingly approved to amend the Constitution, removing discriminatory references and giving the national parliament the power to legislate specifically for Indigenous Australians.

In 1965, one of the earliest Aboriginal graduates from the University of Sydney, Charles Perkins, helped organise the Freedom Ride into parts of Australia to expose discrimination and inequality. In 1966, the Gurindji people of Wave Hill Station (owned by the Vestey Group) commenced strike action, known as the Gurindji strike, led by Vincent Lingiari, in a quest for equal pay and recognition of Indigenous land rights.

From the 1960s, Australian writers began to re-assess European assumptions about Aboriginal Australia – with works including Alan Moorehead's The Fatal Impact (1966) and Geoffrey Blainey's landmark history Triumph of the Nomads (1975). In 1968, anthropologist W.E.H. Stanner described the lack of historical accounts of relations between European and Aboriginal people as "the great Australian silence". Historian Henry Reynolds argues that there was a "historical neglect" of Aboriginal people by historians until the late 1960s. Early commentaries often tended to describe Aboriginal people as doomed to extinction following the arrival of Europeans. William Westgarth's 1864 book on the colony of Victoria observed; "the case of the Aborigines of Victoria confirms ...it would seem almost an immutable law of nature that such inferior dark races should disappear."

The Stolen Generations 

The Stolen Generations were the children of Australian Aboriginal and Torres Strait Islander descent who were removed from their families by the Australian Federal and State government agencies and church missions, under acts of their respective parliaments. The removals of those referred to as "half-caste" children were conducted in the period between approximately 1905 and 1967, although in some places mixed-race children were still being taken into the 1970s. Official government estimates are that in certain regions between one in ten and one in three Indigenous Australian children were forcibly taken from their families and communities between 1910 and 1970.

In April 2000, the Aboriginal Affairs Minister John Herron, presented a report in the Australian Parliament that questioned whether there had been a "Stolen Generation", arguing that only 10% of Aboriginal children had been removed, and they did not constitute an entire "generation". The report received media attention and there were protests against the claimed racism in this statement, and was countered by comparing use of this terminology to the World War 2 Lost Generation which also did not comprise an entire generation. On 13 February 2008 Prime Minister Kevin Rudd presented an apology for the "Stolen Generation" as a motion in Parliament.

Mabo Case 

In 1992, the High Court of Australia handed down its decision in the Mabo Case, declaring the previous legal concept of terra nullius to be invalid. That same year, Prime Minister Paul Keating said in his Redfern Park Speech that European settlers were responsible for the difficulties Australian Aboriginal communities continued to face: "We committed the murders. We took the children from their mothers. We practised discrimination and exclusion. It was our ignorance and our prejudice". In 1999 Parliament passed a Motion of Reconciliation drafted by Prime Minister John Howard and Aboriginal Senator Aden Ridgeway naming mistreatment of Indigenous Australians as the most "blemished chapter in our international history".

Current issues 

In response to the Little Children are Sacred Report the Howard Government launched the Northern Territory National Emergency Response in 2007, to reduce child molestation, domestic violence and substance abuse in remote Indigenous communities. The measures of the response which have attracted most criticism comprise the exemption from the Racial Discrimination Act 1975, the compulsory acquisition of an unspecified number of prescribed communities (Measure 5) and the partial abolition of the permit system (Measure 10). These have been interpreted as undermining important principles and parameters established as part of the legal recognition of indigenous land rights in Australia.

The intervention, widely condemned as racist, failed to produce a single child abuse conviction in its first six years Professor James Anaya, a United Nations Special Rapporteur, alleged in 2010 that the policy was "racially discriminating" because measures like banning alcohol and pornography and quarantining a percentage of welfare income for the purchase of essential goods represented a limitation on "individual autonomy". The Rudd Government, the Opposition and a number of prominent indigenous activists condemned Anaya's allegation. Central Australian Aboriginal leader Bess Price criticised the UN for not sending a female repporteur and said that Abaya had been led around by opponents of the intervention to meet with opponents of the intervention.

In the early 21st century, much of Indigenous Australia continued to suffer lower standards of health and education than non-indigenous Australia. In 2007, the Close the Gap campaign was launched by Olympic champions Cathy Freeman and Ian Thorpe with the aim of achieving Indigenous health equality within 25 years.

European Australians

Early British and Irish settlers
In the early decades of the establishment of British colonies in Australia, attitudes to race and ethnicity were imported from the British Isles. The ethnic mix of the early colonists consisted mainly of the four nationalities of the British Isles (England, Irish, Scottish, and Welsh), but also included some Jewish and black African convicts. Sectarianism, particularly anti-Irish-Catholic sentiment was initially enshrined in law, reflecting the difficult position of Irish people within the British Empire. One-tenth of all the convicts who came to Australia on the First Fleet were Catholic and at least half of them were born in Ireland. With Ireland often in revolt against British rule, the Irish enthusiasts of Australia faced surveillance and were denied the public practice of their religion in the early decades of settlement.

Governor Lachlan Macquarie served as the last autocratic Governor of New South Wales, from 1810 to 1821 and had a leading role in the social and economic development of New South Wales which saw it transition from a penal colony to a budding free society. He sought good relations with the Aboriginal population and upset British government opinion by treating emancipists as equal to free-settlers. Soon after, the reformist attorney general, John Plunkett, sought to apply Enlightenment principles to governance in the colony, pursuing the establishment of equality before the law, first by extending jury rights to emancipists, then by extending legal protections to convicts, assigned servants and Aboriginal people. Plunkett twice charged the colonist perpetrators of the Myall Creek massacre of Aboriginal people with murder, resulting in a conviction and his landmark Church Act of 1836 disestablished the Church of England and established legal equality between Anglicans, Catholics, Presbyterians and later Methodists.

While elements of sectarianism and anti- sentiment persisted into the 20th century in Australia, the integration of the Irish, English, Scottish and Welsh nationalities was one of the first notable successes of Australian immigration policy and set a pattern for later migrant intakes of suspicion of minorities giving way to acceptance.

Asian Australians

Early Asian and Pacific Islander immigration 

The Australian colonies had passed restrictive legislation as early as the 1860s, directed specifically at Chinese immigrants. Objections to the Chinese originally arose because of their large numbers, their religious beliefs, the widespread perception that they worked harder, longer and far more cheaply than European Australians and the view that they habitually engaged in gambling and smoking opium. It was also felt they would lower living standards, threaten democracy and that their numbers could expand into a "yellow tide". Later, a popular cry was raised against increasing numbers of Japanese (following Japan's victory over China in the Sino-Japanese War), South Asians and Kanakas (South Pacific islanders). Popular support for White Australia, always strong, was bolstered at the Paris Peace Conference in 1919 when the Australian delegation led the fight to defeat a Japanese-sponsored racial-equality amendment to the League of Nations Covenant.  The Japanese amendment was closely tied to their claim on German New Guinea and so was very largely refuted on security grounds.

Buckland riot 
The Buckland riot was an anti-Chinese race riot that occurred on 4 July 1857, in the goldfields of the Buckland Valley, Victoria, Australia, near present-day Porepunkah. At the time approximately 2000 Chinese and 700 European migrants were living in the Buckland area.

Lambing Flat Riots 
The Lambing Flat Riots (1860–1861) were a series of violent anti-Chinese demonstrations that took place in the Burrangong region, in New South Wales, Australia. They occurred on the goldfields at Spring Creek, Stoney Creek, Back Creek, Wombat, Blackguard Gully, Tipperary Gully, and Lambing Flat. Anti-Chinese sentiment was widespread during the Victorian gold rush. This resentment manifested on 4 July 1857 when around 100 European rioters attacked Chinese settlements. The rioters had just left a public meeting at the Buckland Hotel where the riot ringleaders decided they would attempt to expel all the Chinese in the Buckland Valley. Contemporaneous newspaper reports claim that the riot was "led by Americans 'inflamed by liquor'".

During the riot Chinese miners were beaten and robbed then driven across the Buckland River. At least three Chinese miners died reportedly of ill-health and entire encampments and a recently constructed Joss house were destroyed.

Police arrested thirteen European accused rioters, however the empaneled juries acquitted all of major offences "amid the cheers of bystanders". The verdicts of the juries were later criticised in the press.

Events in the Australian goldfields in the 1850s led to hostility toward Chinese miners on the part of many Europeans, which was to affect many aspects of European-Chinese relations in Australia for the next century. Some of the sources of conflict between European and Chinese miners arose from the nature of the industry they were engaged in. Most gold mining in the early years was alluvial mining, where the gold was in small particles mixed with dirt, gravel and clay close to the surface of the ground, or buried in the beds of old watercourses or "leads". Extracting the gold took no great skill, but it was hard work, and generally speaking, the more work, the more gold the miner won. Europeans tended to work alone or in small groups, concentrating on rich patches of ground, and frequently abandoning a reasonably rich claim to take up another one rumoured to be richer. Very few miners became wealthy; the reality of the diggings was that relatively few miners found even enough gold to earn them a living.

Internment of Japanese and Taiwanese people in Australia during WWII 

Historically, Taiwanese Australians have had a significant presence in Tatura and Rushworth, two neighbouring countryside towns respectively located in the regions of Greater Shepparton and Campaspe (Victoria), in the fertile Goulburn Valley. During World War II, ethnic-Japanese (from Australia, Southeast Asia and the Pacific) and ethnic-Taiwanese (from the Netherlands East Indies) were interned nearby to these towns as a result of anti-espionage/collaboration policies enforced by the Australian government (and WWII Allies in the Asia-Pacific region). Roughly 600 Taiwanese civilians (entire families, including mothers, children and the elderly) were held at "Internment Camp No. 4", located in Rushworth but nominally labeled as being part of the "Tatura Internment Group", between January 1942 and March 1946. Most of the Japanese and Taiwanese civilians were innocent and had been arrested for racist reasons (see the related article "Internment of Japanese Americans", an article detailing similar internment in America). Several Japanese and Taiwanese people were born in the internment camp and received British (Australian) birth certificates from a nearby hospital. Several Japanese people who were born in the internment camp were named "Tatura" in honour of their families' wartime internment at Tatura. During wartime internment, many working age adults in the internment camp operated small businesses (including a sewing factory) and local schools within the internment camp. Regarding languages, schools mainly taught English, Japanese, Mandarin and Taiwanese languages (Hokkien, Hakka, Formosan). Filipinos are purported to have also been held at the camp, alongside Koreans, Manchus (possibly from Manchukuo), New Caledonians, New Hebrideans, people from the South Seas Mandate, people from Western New Guinea (and presumably also Papua New Guinea) and Aboriginal Australians (who were mixed-Japanese).

After the war, internees were resettled in their country of ethnic origin, rather than their country of nationality or residence, with the exception of Japanese Australians, who were generally allowed to remain in Australia. Non-Australian Japanese, who originated from Southeast Asia and the Pacific, were repatriated to Occupied Japan. On the other hand, Taiwanese, most of whom originated from the Netherlands East Indies, were repatriated to Occupied Taiwan. The repatriation of Taiwanese during March 1946 caused public outcry in Australia due to the allegedly poor living conditions aboard the repatriating ship "Yoizuki", in what became known as the "Yoizuki Hellship scandal". Post-WWII, the Australian government was eager to expel any Japanese internees who did not possess Australian citizenship, and this included the majority of Taiwanese internees as well. However, the Republic of China (ROC) was an ally of Australia, and since the ROC had occupied Taiwan during October 1945, many among the Australian public believed that the Taiwanese internees should be deemed citizens of the ROC, and, therefore, friends of Australia, not to be expelled from the country, or at least not in such allegedly appalling conditions. This debate concerning the citizenship of Taiwanese internees—whether they were Chinese or Japanese—further inflamed public outrage at their allegedly appalling treatment by the Australian government. Additionally, it was technically true that several "camp babies"—internees who had been born on Australian soil whilst their parents were interned—possessed Australian birth certificates, which made them legally British subjects. However, many of these camp babies were also deported from the country alongside their non-citizen parents. There was also a minor controversy regarding the destination of repatriation, with some of the less Japan-friendly Taiwanese fearing that they would be repatriated to Japan, though this was resolved when they learnt that they were being repatriated to Taiwan instead.

On January 5, 1993, a plaque was erected at the site of the internment camp at Tatura (Rushworth) to commemorate the memory of wartime internment. Forty-six Japanese and Taiwanese ex-internees, as well as a former (Australian) camp guard, are listed on the plaque.

Assaults against Indian students

Australia is a popular and longstanding destination for international students. End of year data for 2009 found that of the 631,935 international students enrolled in Australia, drawn from more than 217 different countries, some 120,913 were from India, making them the second largest group. That same year, protests were conducted in Melbourne by Indian students and widescale media coverage in India alleged that a series of robberies and assaults against Indian students should be ascribed to racism in Australia. According to a report tabled by the Overseas Indian Affairs Ministry, in all some 23 incidents were found to have involved "racial overtones" such as "anti Indian remarks". In response, the Australian Institute of Criminology in consultation with the Department of Foreign Affairs and Trade and Department of Immigration and Citizenship sought to quantify the extent to which Indians were the subject of crime in Australia and found overall that international students as recorded victims of crime in Australia, were either "less likely" or "as likely" to be victims of physical assault and other theft, but that there was a "substantial over-representation of Indian students in retail/commercial robberies". The report found however that the proficiency of Indians in the English language and their consequent higher engagement in employment in the services sector ("including service stations, convenience stores, taxi drivers and other employment that typically involves working late night shifts alone and come with an increased risk of crime, either at the workplace or while travelling to and from work") was a more likely explanation for the crime rate differential than was any "racial motivation".

On 30 May 2009, Indian students protested against what they claimed were racist attacks, blocking streets in central Melbourne. Thousands of students gathered outside the Royal Melbourne Hospital where one of the victims was admitted. The protest, however, was called off early on the next day morning after the protesters accused police of "ramrodding" them to break up their sit-in. On 4 June 2009, China expressed concern over the matter – Chinese are the largest foreign student population in Australia with approximately 130,000 students. In light of this event, the Australian Government started a Helpline for Indian students to report such incidents. Australian High Commissioner to India John McCarthy said that there may have been an element of racism involved in some of the assaults reported upon Indians, but that they were mainly criminal in nature. The United Nations High Commissioner for Human Rights, Navi Pillay, termed these attacks "disturbing" and called for Australia to investigate the matters further. In the aftermath of these attacks, other investigations alleged racist elements in the Victorian police force.

However, in 2011, the Australian Institute of Criminology released a study entitled Crimes Against International Students:2005–2009. This found that over the period 2005–2009, international students were statistically less likely to be assaulted than the average person in Australia. Indian students experienced an average assault rate in some jurisdictions, but overall they experienced lower assault rates than the Australian average. They did, however, experience higher rates of robbery, overall. The study could not sample incidents of crime that were not reported. Additionally, multiple surveys of international students over the period of 2009–10 found a majority of Indian students felt safe.

Current issues

Middle Eastern Australians

Cronulla riots

The Cronulla riots of 2005 were a series of racially motivated mob confrontations which originated in and around Cronulla, a beachfront suburb of Sydney, New South Wales. Soon after the riot, ethnically motivated violent incidents occurred in several other Sydney suburbs.

On Sunday, 11 December 2005, approximately 5,000 people gathered to protest against alleged incidents of assaults and intimidatory behaviour by groups of Middle Eastern-looking youths from the suburbs of South Western Sydney. The crowd initially assembled without incident, but violence broke out after a large segment of the mostly white crowd chased a man of Middle Eastern appearance into a hotel and two other youths of Middle Eastern appearance were assaulted on a train.

The following nights saw several retaliatory violent assaults in the communities near Cronulla and Maroubra, with large gatherings around south western Sydney, and an unprecedented police lock-down of Sydney beaches and surrounding areas, between Wollongong and Newcastle.

SBS / Al Jazeera (for Al Jazeera) explores these events in 2013 (2015) four-part documentary series "Once Upon a Time in Punchbowl", specifically in last two episodes, "Episode three, 2000–2005" and "Episode four, 2005-present".

In 2012, shock jock Alan Jones lost an appeal against charges that he deliberately incited the riots on his 2GB radio show.

Contemporary issues

Asylum seekers
 
Commentators such as writer Christos Tsiolkas have accused the Australian Government of racism in its approach to asylum seekers in Australia. Both major parties have supported a ban on asylum seekers who arrive by boat. For many years Australia operated the Pacific Solution, which included the relocation of asylum seekers arriving by boat in offshore detention centres on Manus and Nauru. Social justice advocates and international organisations such as Amnesty International have condemned Australia's policies, with one describing them as "an appeal to fear and racism".

Anti-Semitism in Australia 
From 2013 to 2017 over 673 incidents of anti-Semitic behaviour were reported, with an increase of such incidents in recent years. Incidents include spitting, such as a woman in her 60s who was spat on after being called "Jewish scum".

Far-right and neo-Nazi groups

The 21st century has seen the creation of several groups with racist manifestos in Australia, from street gangs (Australian Defence League) through loosely grouped protest groups (Reclaim Australia) to far-right political parties (Fraser Anning's Conservative National Party). The ideology of the Antipodean Resistance, a neo-Nazi clan headquartered in Melbourne, is based on homophobia, anti-Semitism, white supremacism and Australian nationalism. Some groups, such as the True Blue Crew, are committed to violence. The Australian Security Intelligence Organisation (ASIO) monitors this and other groups for signs of far-right terrorism.

Pauline Hanson and One Nation 

Senator Pauline Hanson, in her 1998 maiden speech to Parliament called for the abolition of multiculturalism and said that "reverse racism" was being applied to "mainstream Australians" who were not entitled to the same welfare and government funding as minority groups. She has said that Australia was in danger of being "swamped by Asians", and that these immigrants "have their own culture and religion, form ghettos and do not assimilate". She was widely accused of racism. In 2006, she achieved notoriety by asserting that Africans bring disease into Australia. In June 2021, following media reports that the proposed national curriculum was "preoccupied with the oppression, discrimination and struggles of Indigenous Australians", the Australian Senate approved a motion tabled by right-wing senator Pauline Hanson calling on the federal government to reject CRT, despite it not being included in the curriculum.

Alleviation 

Western Sydney, a suburban region with a long history of migrant settlement, became one of the first regions in Australia to enact public planning to counter  cultural racism.

In 2020, the Victorian Government set up an Anti-Racism Taskforce, designed to advise and consider issues such as unconscious bias, privilege, and how race intersects with other forms of discrimination, as well as how racism manifests through employment and in access to services.

Closing the Gap

Uluru Statement from the Heart

Legislation relating to racism

Racist legislation in Australian history
Some notable legislation which might be said to be based on racist theory:
 Immigration Restriction Act 1901, to prescribe where migrants to Australia were accepted from (this in part became the basis for the White Australia Policy.)
Pacific Island Labourers Act 1901 designed to facilitate the deportation of Pacific Island workers from Australia.
Commonwealth Franchise Act 1902 gave women the vote across all states, but allowed states to restrict voting rights for "natives".

Anti-racist legislation in contemporary Australia
The following constituted important legal reforms in the movement towards racial equality:
 1958 revision of the Migration Act, introduced a simpler system for entry and abolished the "dictation test".
 1962 Commonwealth Electoral Act, provided that all Indigenous Australians should have the right to enrol and vote at federal elections (previously this right had been restricted in some states other than for Aboriginal ex-servicemen, who secured the right to vote in all states under 1949 legislation).
 Migration Act 1966, effectively dismantled the White Australia Policy and increased access to non-European migrants.
 Aboriginal Land Rights (Northern Territory) Act 1976, was a significant step in legal recognition of Aboriginal land ownership.

The following Australian Federal and State legislation relates to racism and discrimination:
Commonwealth Racial Discrimination Act 1975
Commonwealth Racial Hatred Act (1995)
Human Rights and Equal Opportunity Commission Act (1986)
New South Wales: Anti-Discrimination Act (1977)
South Australia: Prohibition of Discrimination Act 1966 (SA) under Don Dunstan, then Attorney-General of South Australia (now Equal Opportunity Act (1984)) and Racial Vilification Act (1996). The Prohibition of Discrimination Act 1966 (SA) made race discrimination on the basis of skin colour and country of origin and in circumstances such as the provision of food, drink, services and accommodation and in the termination of employment a criminal offence.
Western Australia: Equal Opportunity Act (1984) and Criminal Code
Australian Capital Territory: Discrimination Act (1991)
Queensland: Anti-Discrimination Act (1991)
Northern Territory: Anti-Discrimination Act (1992)
Victoria: Equal Opportunity Act (1995) and Racial and Religious Tolerance Act 2001
Tasmania: Anti-Discrimination Act (1998)

See also

 Aboriginal deaths in custody 
 George Floyd protests in Australia 
 Institutional racism
 Institutional racism in Australia
 List of massacres of Indigenous Australians
 Racism by country
 RacismNotWelcome, a grassroots campaign
 Racial violence in Australia
 White privilege in Australia
Initiatives by South Australian Premier Don Dunstan

Indigenous advocates

Linda Burney, MP 
Pat Dodson
Adam Goodes, AFL player
Stan Grant the elder
Stan Grant (journalist) 
June Oscar
 Nova Peris 
Nicky Winmar
 Ken Wyatt
 Don Dunstan, Former Premier of South Australia

References

Citations

Works cited

Further reading
 
  
Justin Healey: Racism in Australia, Published by Spinney Press, 2003  
Racism in Australia: findings of a survey on racist attitudes and experiences of racism, University of Hawaii
Mathias Royce: The Rise and Propagation of Political Right-Wing Extremism: The Identification and Assessment of Common Sovereign Economic and Socio-Demographic Determinants, SMC – Swiss Management Center, Working Paper Series, 5 August 2010, Available at SSRN 
 "Once Upon a Time in Punchbowl", SBS (for Al Jazeera) TV series, about the history of the Arab and Lebanese communities in Australia, their struggle to be accepted as Australians, etc. 
 Australia Says Sorry TIME
 CERD concluding observation on Australia, 2010
 Report of the UN Special Rapporteur on Contemporary forms of racism, racial discrimination, xenophobia and related intolerance on his visit to Australia, 2002
 All Together Now, charity focussed on erasing racism in Australia
 Racism. It Stops With Me, a government campaign to address racism
 Racism No Way, a program for schools

 
Australian culture
Australia
Racism in Oceania